The Coat of arms of Malacca resembles European heraldic designs, and descended from that of Malaysia and the Federated Malay States under British colonial rule.

The four colours on the arms: red, white, yellow and blue indicate that Malacca is part of Malaysia. The star and crescent, which stand on the crest represents Islam, the official religion of the state. The five kerises represent the five legendary warriors of the ancient Malacca Sultanate, who are Hang Tuah, Hang Jebat, Hang Kasturi, Hang Lekir, and Hang Lekiu.

The two mouse-deer supporting the shield serve to recall the incident involving the mouse-deer: legend has it that a mouse-deer had attacked one of the hunting dogs brought by the entourage of Parameswara, the first ruler of the state, and kicked the dog into the river. Parameswara, who had fleeing the kingdom of Singapura at this point, considered the incident to be a good omen and decided to found a kingdom under it. He decides to name the settlement as Malacca, after the Malacca tree which he leaned against while witnessing the event, hence the tree is depicted in the shield.

A scroll at the bottom denotes the state motto: '"Bersatu Teguh" ("firmly united" or "united we stand") on left side with romanised Malay and right side with Jawi script, and the state name written in Romanised Malay – "Melaka" on centre.

The state coat of arms can be blazoned as:

Shield: Argent, a Malacca tree standing on a base proper; on the dexter a flank Or and on the sinister a flank Gules, all below a chief Azure, five krisses per pale Or.

Crest: A crescent and mullet Or.

Supporters: Two mousedeers proper.

Historical state arms

City and municipal emblems

See also
 Flag of Malacca
 Armorial of Malaysia

References

External links
 Coat of Arms of Malacca
 Coat of Arms of Malacca

Malacca
Malacca
Malacca
Malacca
Malacca
Malacca
Malacca